Wrightsville Beach is a town in New Hanover County, North Carolina, United States. Wrightsville Beach is just east of Wilmington and is part of the Wilmington Metropolitan Statistical Area. The population was 2,477 at the 2010 census. It served as a filming location of Dawson's Creek.

History

Establishment

The first documented history of present-day Wrightsville Beach began when the Lord's Proprietor granted land to Charles Harrison in 1725. The land grant was for  located north of the present day Heide Trask Bridge that runs over the Intracoastal Waterway and was the first formal ownership of property near the beach. In the 1700 and 1800s the Hammocks were accessible by a footbridge from the mainland, but the beach itself was only accessible by boat.

In 1883, the Carolina Yacht Club was founded by seven local men who loved to sail and race boats. It is currently known as the seventh oldest Yacht club in America. It was the first permanent structure on the beach and was only accessible by boat. This was followed by a few scattered cottages and commercial buildings began springing up on what was then known as Ocean View Beach.

The town bears the name of Joshua G. Wright of Wilmington (1842-1890), who developed a local realtor company. A post office called Wrightsville was subsequently established in 1881. Accessibility to the beach improved in 1887 when Shell Road was completed, running from Wilmington to the edge of the current Intracoastal Waterway. The town was incorporated in 1899 as Wrightsville Beach, in honor of the Wright family of Wilmington and the community of Wrightsville on the mainland side of Harbor Island.

Development
By the late 1800s, ownership of the land had passed to the MacRae family of Wilmington. In 1887 passenger service began on the Wilmington Sea Coast Railroad from Wilmington, bringing people from downtown Wilmington to the edge of Bradley Creek. In 1889, the Ocean View Railroad built a track across Banks Channel to carry visitors to the oceanfront.

Having already established a power generation company, in 1902 Hugh MacRae (March 30, 1865 - October 20, 1951) took control of the city of Wilmington's utilities by forming the Consolidated Railroad, Power & Light Company (CRPLCo - subsequently renamed the Tidewater Power Company, which became part of the Carolina Power & Light Company in 1952 post-MacRae's death). The Ocean View Railroad was subsequently converted to an electric streetcar. After MacRae subsequently took over the Wilmington Sea Coast Railroad, he consolidated the area's lines into one electric streetcar system, carrying people from downtown Wilmington to one of seven stations along South Lumina Avenue. Automobiles were banned from Wrightsville Beach until the 1930s, giving the CRPLCo streetcar a virtual monopoly on transportation. The streetcar operations also carried freight with adapted freight cars, often part of the operations consist mainly of carrying ice in an era before indoor refrigeration was available, allowing the subsequent development of far more snack stands and soda shops along the beach.

With the CRPLCo electric streetcar now in operation, the MacRae family began developing plots of land both along the streetcar line and Wrightsville Beach as a beach resort. The two hotels on the beach were renovated, and the first public entertainment venue on the beach was built, named Lumina, because of the 6,000 exterior lights that illuminated the building. It was opened in 1905 with a  venue for dancing and socializing, games, food, and entertainment.  It attracted many entertainers and musicians, including the Big Bands of the 1930s and 40s. In 1913, Lumina enlarged the dance floor and added a movie screen in the surf from which they showed silent films. After World War II, its popularity slowly declined due to the cancellation of the trolley service to the beach in 1940 and the growing number of other entertainment venues in and around the area. Lumina changed hands a few times after the war as people tried various ways to make it the hottest spot on the beach. It was a skating alley and then a bar before it was closed in 1972. The health department then condemned lumina. It was torn down in 1973 to make room for condominiums along the beach.

In 1923 Shell Island was purchased by the Home Realty Company to build a resort for African Americans in the community. They built a pavilion, boardwalks, concessions, and bathhouses. Visitors could ride the streetcar to Harbor Island and board the ferry, taking them over to Shell Island. But in 1926, a massive fire burned every structure on the island. Never rebuilt, transportation to Shell Island also hence ceased.

In 1937 the third pier in North Carolina, the Ocean View Pier, was constructed. In 1939 it was bought by Johnnie Mercer and renamed after its new owner. Hurricanes have really taken a toll on the pier. It was hit by hurricanes Hazel, Connie, Bertha, and Fran. After Fran in 1996, the pier was so damaged that it was closed until 2002, reopening with a whole new look. The current Johnnie Mercer's Pier is made of reinforced concrete and still stands today. A second pier was constructed in 1938 by Floyd Cox and named the Mira Mar Fishing Pier. It was built on top of the wreck of the Fanny and Jenny, a Confederate blockade runner that ran aground during its maiden voyage in the Civil War in 1864. The wreckage created a natural reef, making for good fishing. The pier was later bought and briefly renamed the Luna Fishing Pier and then the Crystal Fishing Pier.

The construction and popularity of these new buildings were made possible in part by constructing a highway and car bridge to the beach in 1935. A causeway from the mainland to Harbor Island was built in 1926. This allowed people to drive to the first part of the beach. The opening of a road all the way from the mainland to the beach, with a bridge over Banks Channel, allowed residents and visitors to access the town via road easily. On April 18, 1939, W.R. "Tuck" Savage, who had operated the first electric streetcar in Wilmington, also piloted the city's last one on a return trip to Wrightsville Beach.

Storm activity
Wrightsville Beach has weathered many storms. Two devastating hurricanes hit in 1899. The first hurricane hit on August 17, making landfall at Hatteras with widespread destruction at Wrightsville Beach. The second storm came just south of Wrightsville Beach on November 1 at high tide. Many structures and buildings on the island were damaged. Cottages were wiped off the beach, the train trestle was damaged, and the Carolina Yacht Club had to be completely rebuilt. A few smaller storms hit in the early 1900s, but none did extensive damage.

The next big hit came in 1954 from Hurricane Hazel, which made landfall at Holden Beach. This was the third named hurricane to hit the area within seven weeks and is the only category 4 hurricane to make landfall in North Carolina. The storm headed up the coast devastating Yaupon Beach, Long Beach and Southport before hitting Carolina Beach and Wrightsville Beach. Hurricane Connie hit the beach in 1955 and caused damages to Johnnie Mercer's Pier and other houses along the beach.

In 1996, the area was hit by two hurricanes, Bertha and Fran, within months of each other. The storms destroyed the beaches' fishing piers and caused hundreds of thousands of dollars worth of damage.

Hurricane Florence made landfall in Wrightsville Beach in 2018 as a Category 1 storm with maximum  winds.

Historic sites

 Bradley-Latimer Summer House
 Cape Fear Civil War Shipwreck Discontiguous District
 Mount Lebanon Chapel and Cemetery
 James D. and Frances Sprunt Cottage, listed on the National Register of Historic Places.

Geography

The area's geography is composed of two islands separated by two different bodies of water. Bradley Creek runs between the mainland and the Hammocks (currently known as Harbor Island). The Hammocks are then separated from the beach by Banks Channel. Wrightsville Beach lies south of Figure Eight Island, separated by Mason's Inlet, and north of Masonboro Island, separated by Masonboro Inlet.

Demographics

2020 census

As of the 2020 United States census, there were 2,473 people, 1,166 households, and 531 families residing in the town.

2000 census
At the 2000 census, there were 2,593 people, 1,275 households and 566 families residing in the town. The population density was 1,943.4 per square mile (752.8/km2). There were 3,050 housing units at an average density of 2,285.9 per square mile (885.4/km2). The racial makeup of the town was 98.11% White, 0.27% African American, 0.31% Native American, 0.54% Asian, 0.08% Pacific Islander, 0.19% from other races, and 0.50% from two or more races. Hispanic or Latino of any race were 0.66% of the population.

There were 1,275 households, of which 10.7% had children under the age of 18 living with them, 37.6% were married couples living together, 4.0% had a female householder with no husband present, and 55.6% were non-families. 32.0% of all households were made up of individuals, and 7.1% had someone living alone 65 years of age or older. The average household size was 2.02, and the average family size was 2.47.

Age distribution was 8.9% under the age of 18, 16.8% from 18 to 24, 34.0% from 25 to 44, 25.3% from 45 to 64, and 15.0% who were 65 years of age or older. The median age was 37 years. For every 100 females, there were 125.3 males. For every 100 females age 18 and over, there were 126.1 males.

The median household income was $55,903, and the median family income was $71,641. Males had a median income of $35,388 versus $36,083 for females. The per capita income for the town was $36,575. About 2.0% of families and 9.5% of the population were below the poverty line, including 9.4% of those under age 18 and 2.2% of those age 65 or over.

References

External links
 Wrightsville Beach Museum
 Official website of Wrightsville Beach, NC

Towns in New Hanover County, North Carolina
Towns in North Carolina
Beaches of North Carolina
Populated places established in 1853
Barrier islands of North Carolina
Cape Fear (region)
Landforms of New Hanover County, North Carolina
1853 establishments in North Carolina
Populated coastal places in North Carolina